Andrei Mstislavovich Chuvilaev (born 23 May 1978) is a Russian former pair skater. With Viktoria Borzenkova, he won the 2003 Winter Universiade and 2004 Bofrost Cup on Ice.

Career 
Chuvilaev skated seriously from the age of five and switched to pairs at 11. He began competing internationally with Olga Semkina in 1994. The pair placed seventh at the 1995 World Junior Championships, held in Budapest in November 1994. They won gold at the 1995 Czech Skate, silver at the 1996 Nebelhorn Trophy, and bronze at the 1997 Winter Universiade.

Chuvilaev began competing with Viktoria Borzenkova in 1999. Early in their partnership, they were coached by Ludmila Koblova in Moscow. They finished seventh at the 2002 European Championships and 15th at the 2002 World Championships. They formed an unusual pair due to their height, she being 168 cm tall and he 200 cm. In April 2003, they moved to Saint Petersburg and began working with Oksana Kazakova and Tamara Moskvina. The pair retired from competition in 2006.

Programs 
(with Borzenkova)

Competitive highlights

With Borzenkova

With Semkina

References

External links 
 

1978 births
Russian male pair skaters
Living people
Figure skaters from Moscow
Universiade medalists in figure skating
Universiade gold medalists for Russia
Universiade bronze medalists for Russia
Competitors at the 2001 Winter Universiade
Medalists at the 2003 Winter Universiade